This is a list of nature centers and environmental education centers in the state of Maryland.

To use the sortable tables: click on the icons at the top of each column to sort that column in alphabetical order; click again for reverse alphabetical order.

References

 Maryland Association for Environmental and Outdoor Education

External links
 Google Map of Nature and Environmental Education Centers in Maryland

 
Nature centers
Maryland